The 1959–60 Turkish National League was the second season of professional football in Turkey. The league consisted of 20 clubs, with Beşiktaş J.K. winning their third championship.

Overview
The original sixteen clubs of the 1959 Milli Lig took part in the 1959–60 edition, along with newly promoted Kasımpaşa, Şeker Hilal, Altınordu, and Feriköy. Beşiktaş won their first league title, winning 11 matches by a 1-0 margin, a record at the time. Metin Oktay finished top scorer with 33 goals. Clubs were not relegated directly, but instead took part in the Baraj Maçları, a competition between the top four amateur clubs and the bottom three Milli Lig clubs.

Altınordu finished first in the Baraj Maçları, allowing them to stay in the Milli Lig. Hacettepe and Adalet were not successful, earning relegation to the Ankara and Istanbul professional leagues respectively. Adana Demirspor and PTT earned promotion to the Milli Lig. Adana Demirspor would become the first club from outside of the big three cities (Ankara, Istanbul, and İzmir) to compete in the Milli Lig during the following season.

Final league table

Results

Baraj Games

References

Turkish National League
1959–60 in Turkish football
Turkey